The 1910 News of the World Match Play was the eighth News of the World Match Play tournament. It was played from Tuesday 4 to Thursday 6 October at Sunningdale Golf Club. 32 players competed in a straight knock-out competition, with each match contested over 18 holes, except for the final which was over 36 holes. The winner received £100 out of a total prize fund of £240. James Sherlock defeated George Duncan 8 & 6 in the final to win the tournament.

Qualification
Entry was restricted to members of the Professional Golfers' Association (PGA). Qualification was by a series of 36-hole stroke-play competitions; one for each of the eight PGA sections. The Southern section had 13 qualifiers, the Northern section 7, the Midland section 4, the Scottish, Welsh and Western sections 2 and the Eastern and Irish sections 1. Compared to 1909 one entry was allocated to the new Eastern section while the Western and Welsh sections were increased from one to two. The Scottish section was reduced to two and the Irish section to one. In the event of a tie for places there was a playoff.

The qualifiers were:

Eastern section: Ernest Riseborough
Irish section: Hugh McNeill
Midland section: Eric Bannister, William Jeffries, Roland Lewis, George Tuck
Northern section: James Douglas Edgar, Horace Fulford, Jack Gaudin, Sandy Herd, Cyril Hughes, Ted Ray, Charles Roberts
Southern section: Tom Ball, George Duncan, Ernest Gaudin, Rowland Jones, Fred Leach, Charles Mayo, Willie Park Jr., Fred Robson, James Sherlock, James Souter, J.H. Taylor, Harry Vardon, Tom Vardon
Scottish section: John Hunter, Robert Thomson
Western section: Ernest Foord, Ernest Whitcombe
Welsh section: Alfred Matthews, Sam Whiting

Format
The format was unchanged. Matches were over 18 holes except for the final which was over 36 holes. Extra holes were played in the event of a tied match. Two rounds were played on the first day, two more on the second day with the final on the third day.

Results
Source:

Prize money
The winner received £100 and a gold medal, the runner-up £30 and a silver medal, the losing semi-finalists £15 and a bronze medal, while the third round losers received £10 and the second round losers received £5.

References

Golf tournaments in England
News of the World Match Play
News of the World Match Play
October 1910 sports events